The Herodotus Machine was a machine described by Herodotus, a Greek historian born in Halicarnassus, Caria (modern-day Bodrum, Turkey). Herodotus claims this invention enabled the ancient Egyptians to construct the pyramids. The contraption supposedly allowed workers to lift heavy building materials. Herodotus is believed to have encountered the device while traveling through Egypt. With limited reference and no true schematics, this machine has stimulated many historians' theories of how the ancient Egyptians were able to create pyramids.

Herodotus in Egypt

Herodotus is suspected of having embellished – or made up entirely – some of his historical accounts, but scholars generally accept this particular account as Herodotus provides otherwise reasonable accounts of Egypt and it would have been quite possible for someone living in Halicarnassus to safely and easily travel to Egypt during Herodotus' lifetime. Trade existed between the Greek City States and the kingdom of Egypt. In Egypt Herodotus is thought to have conversed with locals on the matter.

Herodotus' description

Herodotus provides a description of the process in Histories.

Leonardo da Vinci is believed to have sketched a machine based on Herodotus' description. Later depictions are premised upon da Vinci's sketches in the Codex Madrid. Visual depictions cannot authoritatively claim to represent Herodotus' machine.

Since Herodotus provides more of a description of the components of the design rather than detailed form or usage, many ideas have been put forward and scale models built.

See also
Egyptian pyramid construction techniques

References

Further reading
 See the main page on Herodotus.
 Herodotus' writings, more specifically his Histories.

External links
  

 Animation and blog describing a pyramid-construction machine built inside Khufu (Cheops). www.impacttectonics.org

Ancient Egyptian architecture
Ancient Egyptian science
Ancient Egyptian technology
Egyptian inventions
History of construction